Molippa is a genus of moths in the family Saturniidae first described by Francis Walker in 1855.

Species
The genus includes the following species:

Molippa azuelensis Lemaire, 1976
Molippa basina Maassen & Weyding, 1885
Molippa basinoides Bouvier, 1926
Molippa bertrandi Lemaire, 1982
Molippa bertrandoides Brechlin & Meister, 2008
Molippa binasa (Schaus, 1924)
Molippa convergens (Walker, 1855)
Molippa coracoralinae Lemaire & Tangerini, 2002
Molippa cruenta (Walker, 1855)
Molippa eophila (Dognin, 1908)
Molippa flavocrinata Mabille, 1896
Molippa larensis Lemaire, 1972
Molippa latemedia (Druce, 1890)
Molippa luzalessarum Naumann, Brosch & Wenczel, 2005
Molippa nibasa Maassen & Weyding, 1885
Molippa ninfa (Schaus, 1921)
Molippa pearsoni Lemaire, 1982
Molippa pilarae Naumann, Brosch, Wenczel & Bottger, 2005
Molippa placida (Schaus, 1921)
Molippa rosea (Druce, 1886)
Molippa sabina Walker, 1855
Molippa simillima E. D. Jones, 1907
Molippa strigosa (Maassen & Weyding, 1885)
Molippa superba (Burmeister, 1878)
Molippa tusina (Schaus, 1921)
Molippa wenczeli Meister & Brechlin, 2008
Molippa wittmeri Lemaire, 1976

References

Hemileucinae